Boomerang is the first Japanese single (second overall) by South Korean girl group The Grace. It was released on January 25, 2006 by Rhythm Zone, which released in both CD and CD+DVD (Limited Edition) versions. The single was previously released as B-side track of their Korean debut single "Too Good". The single ranked #110 on the Oricon charts and charted for 1 week, selling 967 copies.

Track listing

CD Only
 "Boomerang"
 "Do You Know?" feat. Sunday
 "Boomerang" (Instrumental)
 "Do You Know?" (Instrumental)

CD+DVD

CD Portion
 "Boomerang"
 "Do You Know?" feat. Sunday
 "Boomerang" (Instrumental)
 "Do You Know?" (Instrumental)

DVD Portion
 "Boomerang" Promotion video
 天上智喜 Special interview
 Off shot & making

External links
  Official Website

2006 singles
2006 songs
Rhythm Zone singles
The Grace (band) songs
Song articles with missing songwriters